The Portland Memory Garden is a garden and park in Portland, Oregon's Lents neighborhood, in the United States.

Description
The garden, part of Ed Benedict Park, is designed for people with Alzheimer's disease and other memory issues. The project was a collaboration of the following groups: American Society of Landscape Architects, Center of Design for an Aging Society, Legacy Health Systems, Oregon-Greater Idaho Chapter of the Alzheimer's Association, Portland Parks & Recreation, and Portland State University's School of Urban Studies & Planning.

History
The garden was dedicated in May 2002.

References

External links

 
 Official website
 About Us: What is a Memory Garden? at Center for Design

2002 establishments in Oregon
Gardens in Oregon
Lents, Portland, Oregon
Parks in Portland, Oregon